The Lyndon Baines Johnson Department of Education Building is a federal office building in Washington, D.C., which serves as the headquarters of the United States Department of Education.

History
Construction of the building started in 1959 and concluded in 1961; it was originally known as Federal Office Building 6 (FOB 6). The building was initially used by NASA and the then Department of Health, Education, and Welfare (HEW). In 1979, occupancy of the building was given to the newly formed Department of Education. The building also houses the National Library of Education, which was established in 1995.

Ernest L. Boyer, U.S. Commissioner of Education in the late 1970s, sought to have the building renamed—he suggested it be named after Horace Mann—but the name remained Federal Office Building 6. In 2007, the building was renamed in honor of Lyndon B. Johnson, 36th president of the United States.

References

External links

 Lyndon Baines Johnson Department of Education Building at GSA.gov
 , which renamed the building in 2007

United States Department of Education
Buildings of the United States government in Washington, D.C.
Office buildings in Washington, D.C.
Government buildings completed in 1961
1961 establishments in Washington, D.C.
Southwest Federal Center